Road Rules: Maximum Velocity Tour is the ninth season of the MTV reality television series Road Rules. It took place mostly in the southern areas of the United States and in South Africa. A casting special aired on June 6, 2000, and the season premiered two weeks later on June 19, 2000.

Cast

Episodes

After filming
Holly Brentson married Road Rules: Down Under cast member Chadwick Pelletier.

Between 2013 and 2014, Theo Von served as the host for the comedy game show Deal with It on TBS. In 2016, Netflix released Theo Von's first comedy special, titled No Offense and his second comedy special in 2021.

The Challenge

Challenge in bold indicates that the contestant was a finalist on the Challenge.

References

External links

Road Rules
2000 American television seasons
Television shows filmed in South Africa